Hypsipterygidae is a small family of bugs in the order Hemiptera, known from Africa and Southeast Asia. There are 4 extant species in one genus, Hypsipteryx, and one fossil species. They resemble, but are unrelated to, the family Tingidae.

Species
 Hypsipteryx ecpaglus Drake, 1961
 †Hypsipteryx hoffeinsorum Bechly & Wittmann, 2000
 Hypsipteryx machadoi Drake, 1961
 Hypsipteryx ugandensis Štys, 1970
 Hypsipteryx vasarhelyii Rédei, 2007

References

Dipsocoromorpha
Heteroptera families
Monogeneric insect families